Elton railway station is a former railway station in Elton, Cambridgeshire on former  Northampton and Peterborough Railway which connected Peterborough with Northampton via Wellingborough.

The heritage Nene Valley Railway have aspirations of extending towards the site of Elton and onward to as far as a possible, new site at Oundle within the near future.

History
The station opened in 1847 and closed in 1953 to passengers. In 1846 the line, along with the London and Birmingham, became part of the London and North Western Railway. At grouping in 1923 it became part of the London Midland and Scottish Railway.

Elton was the last station along the line before crossing the border into Northamptonshire towards Oundle.

Route

References

External links
 Subterranea Britannica

Disused railway stations in Cambridgeshire
Former London and North Western Railway stations
Railway stations in Great Britain opened in 1847
Railway stations in Great Britain closed in 1953
1847 establishments in England
John William Livock buildings